Charles Baillie may refer to:

Charles Baillie (papal agent) (1542–1625)
Charles Baillie, Lord Jerviswoode (1804–1879), Scottish politician and judge
A. Charles Baillie (born 1939), former chairman and chief executive officer of the Toronto-Dominion Bank
Charlie Baillie (born 1935), former Canadian football player and coach
Charles Cochrane-Baillie, 2nd Baron Lamington (1860–1940), Governor of Queensland (1896–1901)
Charles Baillie (swimmer) (1902–1984), later Charles Baillie Drayton, British swimmer

See also
Charles Baillie-Hamilton (disambiguation)
Charles Bailey (disambiguation)